George Lovi (1939 - 18 February 1993) was a Hungarian-American astronomical cartographer.

References

20th-century American astronomers
American cartographers
20th-century Hungarian astronomers
Hungarian cartographers
1939 births
1993 deaths
20th-century cartographers